Lin Man-ting (born 10 July 1990 in Hualien City, Taiwan), or Claire, is a Taiwanese female footballer and futsal player with Amis descent. She last played for ASPTT Albi. She was the first ever Taiwanese women player to play for a European club. She usually plays as defensive roles such as midfielder or defender. Her sister Lin Chiung-ying is also footballer, representing Canberra United in the Australian Westfield W-League.

Biography
At the age of 17, Lin represented Chinese Taipei U-19 in the AFC U-19 Women's Championship 2007. She also made her senior team debut in 2007, in the qualification games for 2008 Summer Olympics, and became Chinese Taipei's regular start since then.

In January 2010, after fending off contenders from Africa and Canada in the tryout, Lin received a 2-year contract from Real Valladolid Femenino of Spain's Superliga Femenina. Her shirt name is 'Claire'. She soon established herself and became one of the most promising players in the club. Her success in Spain has increased Real Valladolid's, as well as other Spanish clubs', interests and understandings to Taiwanese female players and also motivated the latters to challenge the world stage of football. She currently earns 200 euros with Real Valladolid and due to the low pay rumors have it she will sign with Real Madrid femenino this summer on a 1000 euros a month deal. Following Lin, Real Valladolid decided to sign her compatriots Chen Hsiao-chuan and Tan Wen-lin in April 2010.

References

External links
 Real Valladolid player profile

1990 births
Living people
Taiwanese women's footballers
Amis people
People from Hualien County
Footballers at the 2014 Asian Games
Expatriate women's footballers in Spain
Expatriate women's footballers in France
ASPTT Albi players
Taiwanese expatriates in Spain
Taiwanese expatriate sportspeople in France
Taiwanese women's futsal players
Women's association football midfielders
Asian Games competitors for Chinese Taipei
Sport in Hualien
Chinese Taipei women's international footballers